
Restaurant Wilgenplas is a defunct restaurant in Maarssen, in the Netherlands. It was a fine dining restaurant that was awarded one Michelin star in both 1972 and 1973. It was again awarded a Michelin star in 1988 and retained that rating until 2000.

During the second star-period, head chef was Henny van der Veer

Restaurant De Wilgenplas closed down in 2000, due to bankruptcy.

At present, restaurant De Heeren van Maarssen is located here.

See also
List of Michelin starred restaurants in the Netherlands

References 

Defunct restaurants in the Netherlands
Restaurants in the Netherlands
Michelin Guide starred restaurants in the Netherlands
Restaurants in Stichtse Vecht